The following is a list of newspapers in Alberta. Only weekly and daily newspapers that are published in Alberta are listed.

All weekly newspapers listed and their related information are from the Alberta Weekly Newspaper Association unless referenced otherwise.

Table

See also 
List of radio stations in Alberta 
List of television stations in Alberta 
Media in Alberta

Notes

References

External links 
Alberta Press Council
Alberta Weekly Newspapers Association
Newspapers Canada

Newspapers
Alberta